A total solar eclipse occurred on December 22, 1889. A solar eclipse occurs when the Moon passes between Earth and the Sun, thereby totally or partly obscuring the image of the Sun for a viewer on Earth. A total solar eclipse occurs when the Moon's apparent diameter is larger than the Sun's, blocking all direct sunlight, turning day into darkness. Totality occurs in a narrow path across Earth's surface, with the partial solar eclipse visible over a surrounding region thousands of kilometres wide.
It was visible from Cuba, to the coast of Brazil, and across southern Africa.

The eclipse was the focus of a scientific expedition from the United States, led by David P. Todd of Amherst College and including a team of at least six. Among the members was E. J. Loomis from the American Ephemeris and Nautical Almanac office. It set sail October 16 on the USS Pensacola and set up the eclipse base camp in December, roughly 70 miles south of Luanda in Cape Ledo. Totality was completely obscured by cloud cover. The ship returned to New York after 242 days, with the expedition performing a variety of other scientific studies along the way.

Observations

Related eclipses

Saros 130

References 

 NASA graphic
 Googlemap
 NASA Besselian elements
 Sketchs of Solar Corona December 22, 1889
 Eclipse of December 21, 1889 (Cayenne). Contact print from the original glass negative. Lick Observatory Plate Archive, Mt. Hamilton. 
 On Board the Pensacola--The Eclipse Expedition to the West Coast of Africa by Albert Bergman (A Man Before the Mast), New York, 1890
 
 

1889 12 22
1889 12 22
1889 in science
December 1889 events